The 1919 Major League Baseball season, is best remembered for the Black Sox Scandal, in which the Chicago White Sox threw (purposely lost) the World Series to the Cincinnati Reds, 5–3, in order to illegally gain money from gambling.  This scandal resulted in the dissolution of the National Baseball Commission and the creation of the office of the Commissioner of Baseball. The new commissioner, Kenesaw Mountain Landis, banned eight players from baseball for life. The season began on April 19, 1919, when the Brooklyn Robins defeated the Boston Braves 5–2 at Braves Field in the first game of a doubleheader. The regular season ended on September 29 with the New York Yankees defeating the Philadelphia Athletics 4–2 at Shibe Park, with the infamous 1919 World Series opening two days later in Cincinnati.

Each team played a 140-game schedule, facing the seven other teams in the same league 20 times apiece. A 140-game schedule had last been used in 1903; the 154-game schedule was re-instituted in 1920.

Standings

American League

National League

Postseason

Bracket

League Leaders

American League

National League

Significant Events 

April 19 – Legislature is passed by future New York City mayor Jimmy Walker that allows teams in the state of New York to play baseball on Sundays.  The New York Giants were the first team to take advantage of this change, losing 4–3 to the Philadelphia Phillies in front of 35,000 fans at the Polo Ground.
May 11 – Cincinnati Reds right-hander Hod Eller pitches a 6–0 no-hitter against the St. Louis Cardinals.
Walter Johnson retires 28 consecutive batters during a 12-inning scoreless tie against Jack Quinn and the New York Yankees. Future football immortal George Halas, batting leadoff for New York, goes 0-for-5 with two strikeouts.
May 20 – Red Sox pitcher Babe Ruth hit his first career grand slam home run; the bomb comes against Dave Davenport of the St. Louis Browns in St. Louis. Boston wins 6–4.
August 11 – Cleveland Indians center fielder Tris Speaker ties the AL record for run scoring, crossing the plate five times in 15–9 win at New York.
July 1 – Going 5-for-5 in a 9–4 win over the Phillies, Brooklyn's Ed Konetchy gets his 10th straight hit, tying Jake Gettman's record set with Washington in 1897. Both will be topped by Walt Dropo in 1952.
August 14 – Babe Ruth hits his 17th home run, the first of seven homers in 12 days, which will include his fourth grand slam, setting an AL record until 1959.
August 24 – Cleveland Indians pitcher Ray Caldwell is hit by lightning during the ninth inning of his début for the tribe.  He quickly recovered, reportedly saying "Give me that danged ball and turn me toward the plate", before pitching the final out of the game.
September 2 – The National Commission recommends a best-of-nine World Series, abandoning the traditional seven-game series.  However the change was reverted three years later and the seven game format has remained ever since.
September 10 – Ray Caldwell, the pitcher hit by lightning just a couple of weeks before, throws a no hitter in the Cleveland Indians 3–0 victory over his former team, the New York Yankees.
September 16 – Dutch Ruether beats the New York Giants, 4–3, to clinch the Cincinnati Reds first NL pennant and their first pennant of any kind since their American Association days.
September 21 – In a period of rapidly played games, the Cubs beat the Braves 3–0 in 58 minutes of playing time. It takes the Robins 55 minutes to beat the Reds 3–1, with Slim Sallee throwing 65 pitches, managing to top Christy Mathewson's 69-pitch complete game.
September 24:
The Chicago White Sox's 6–5 win over the St. Louis Browns clinches the AL pennant; the final margin will be 3½ games over the Cleveland Indians.
The Brooklyn Robins defeat the Phillies twice on Fred Luderus Day in Philadelphia. The second game is the 525th in a row played by the Phillies first baseman, who is presented with a diamond stickpin and gold watch between the games to commemorate his endurance effort. He will end the season with a consecutive-game streak of 553.
Boston Red Sox pitcher Waite Hoyt throws nine perfect innings against the New York Yankees, but they score in the 13th in which he gives up 5 hits, ruining his perfect game, and losing the game 2–1.
September 27 – Babe Ruth hit his 29th home run and his first of the year in Washington, to become the first player to hit at least one home run in every AL park in the same season.
September 28 – The New York Giants and Philadelphia Phillies set a record for the quickest nine-inning game in Major League history – 51 minutes for a Giants 6–1 victory at the Polo Grounds.

Managing changes

Off-season changes 
Only one team announced a new manager in the offseason:

Regular Season changes 
One team replaced their manager during the season:

References

External links 
1919 American League season on Baseball-Reference.com
1919 National League season on Baseball-Reference.com
1919 Major League Baseball season schedule at Baseball Reference

 
Major League Baseball seasons